Matthew Ebden and Max Purcell defeated the defending champions Nikola Mektić and Mate Pavić in the final, 7–6(7–5), 6–7(3–7), 4–6, 6–4, 7–6(10–2) to win the gentlemen's doubles tennis title at the 2022 Wimbledon Championships. It was their first major title as a team, and their second title of the season. They saved a total of eight match points en route to the title (three in their first-round match against Ben McLachlan and André Göransson, and five in their semifinal match against Rajeev Ram and Joe Salisbury), and twice recovered from two sets down, having been taken to five sets in five of the six matches they played.

This was the first edition of Wimbledon to feature a champions tie-break (10-point tie-break) when the score reaches six games all in the fifth set, and the third edition to feature a final set tie-break. Hans Hach Verdugo, Philipp Oswald, Roman Jebavý and Hunter Reese were the first players to contest this tiebreak in the gentlemen's doubles event, with the team of Hach Verdugo and Oswald winning the tiebreak 11–9 in their first-round match.

This marked the last time that Men's Doubles was played in the Best of 5 sets as Wimbledon will reduce men's doubles matches to best of three from next year's tournament.

Seeds

Draw

Finals

Top half

Section 1

Section 2

Bottom half

Section 3

Section 4

Other entry information

Wild cards

Source:

Protected ranking

Source:

Alternates

Withdrawals
Before the tournament
  Alexander Bublik /  Jiří Veselý → replaced by  Sander Arends /  Quentin Halys
  Roberto Carballés Baena /  Pablo Carreño Busta → replaced by  Nicholas Monroe /  Tommy Paul
  Federico Coria /  Hugo Dellien → replaced by  Robert Galloway /  Max Schnur
  Marcel Granollers /  Horacio Zeballos → replaced by  Daniel Altmaier /  Carlos Taberner
  Thanasi Kokkinakis /  Nick Kyrgios → replaced by  Diego Hidalgo /  Cristian Rodríguez

Explanatory Notes

References

External links
 Gentlemen's Doubles draw

Men's Doubles
Wimbledon Championship by year – Men's doubles